Ancylobacter polymorphus is a bacterium from the family of Xanthobacteraceae.

References

Further reading

External links
Type strain of Ancylobacter polymorphus at BacDive -  the Bacterial Diversity Metadatabase

Hyphomicrobiales
Bacteria described in 2006